Ancumtoun is a small settlement in the north of the island of North Ronaldsay, Orkney, Scotland. The settlement is within the parish of Cross and Burness.

References

External links

Canmore - North Ronaldsay, Ancumtoun (Parkhouse Mound) site record
Canmore - North Ronaldsay, Tor Ness Cairn site record

Villages in Orkney
North Ronaldsay